Investor Daily (or Investor Daily Indonesia on its nameplate) is a daily business newspaper published in Jakarta, Indonesia. The paper is owned by BeritaSatu Media Holdings, a subsidiary of Lippo Group.

Investor Daily was first published on 26 June 2001 as Investor Indonesia, with Adi Hidayat as the first editor-in-chief. The paper, which was owned by standalone company Investor Group, was initially an evening newspaper; it took its name from its sister publication Investor magazine which was published earlier in 1998. In 2002, Lippo Group acquired Investor Group, its name then changed to the present name and turned into morning publication. Investor Group later provided the bases for Lippo Group's media business that would currently become BeritaSatu Media Holdings in 2011.

References

External links
 Official website

Publications established in 2001
Business newspapers
Newspapers published in Jakarta
2001 establishments in Indonesia
Business in Indonesia